Parody generators are computer programs which generate text that is syntactically correct, but usually meaningless, often in the style of a technical paper or a particular writer. They are also called travesty generators and random text generators.

Their purpose is often satirical, intending to show that there is little difference between the generated text and real examples.

Many work by using techniques such as Markov chains to reprocess real text examples; alternatively, they may be hand-coded.  Generated texts can vary from essay length to paragraphs and tweets. (The term "quote generator" can also be used for software that randomly selects real quotations.)

Examples
Dissociated press, an implementation of a Markov chaining algorithm
Postmodernism Generator, generates essays in the style of post-structuralism
SCIgen, generates nonsensical computer science research papers

See also
 Chatterbot
 Cleverbot
 Filler text, meaningless text used as an example
 Natural language generation
 Paper generator

References

Natural language generation